Willowmore is a town in Sarah Baartman District Municipality in the Eastern Cape province of South Africa.

The town is situated 140 km north-east of Knysna and 117 km south-west of Aberdeen. It was laid out in 1862 on the farm The Willows. It is uncertain whether the name is derived from this farm name and that of its owner, William Moore, or from the maiden name of Petronella Catharina Lehmkuhl and a willow-tree near her house.

References

Populated places in the Dr Beyers Naudé Local Municipality
Populated places established in 1862
1862 establishments in the Cape Colony